Victoria R. Woodards is an American politician serving as the 39th mayor of Tacoma, Washington. She formerly served for seven years as an at-large member of the Tacoma City Council.

Career
During Woodards' tenure on the Tacoma City Council, she worked to establish the city of Tacoma's Office of Equity and Human Rights. Woodards was also a member of the board of Metro Parks Tacoma, and served as president of the Tacoma Urban League. Woodards was first elected as mayor in 2017, and won a second term in 2021. Woodards serves on the advisory board of the United States Conference of Mayors and is vice-chair of the organization's Committee on Jobs, Education, and the Workforce.

In the 2020 Democratic Party presidential primaries, Woodards initially supported former New York City Mayor Michael Bloomberg before endorsing Joe Biden.

Awards 
 2021 Advocacy All-Star Award. Presented by Association of Washington Cities (AWC).

References

External links

Living people
Mayors of Tacoma, Washington
Washington (state) city council members
Women city councillors in Washington (state)
Women mayors of places in Washington (state)
African-American mayors in Washington (state)
21st-century American politicians
21st-century American women politicians
1965 births
African-American city council members
African-American people in Washington (state) politics
21st-century African-American women
21st-century African-American politicians
20th-century African-American people
20th-century African-American women
African-American women mayors